Toéghin  is a department or commune of Kourwéogo Province in central  Burkina Faso. Its capital lies at the town of Toéghin. According to the 1996 census the department has a total population of 17,276.

Towns and villages
 Toéghin	(3 958 inhabitants) (capital)
 Bendogo	(924 inhabitants)
 Doanghin	(689 inhabitants)
 Douré	(718 inhabitants)
 Gogsé	(538 inhabitants)
 Gourpila	(1 469 inhabitants)
 Imkouka	(608 inhabitants)
 Kangré	(364 inhabitants)
 Listenga	(738 inhabitants)
 Moetenga	(871 inhabitants)
 Nahartenga	(1 591 inhabitants)
 Sandogo	(596 inhabitants)
 Sotenga	(583 inhabitants)
 Tanghin	(672 inhabitants)
 Toussougtenga	(497 inhabitants)
 Youbga	(359 inhabitants)
 Zeguedeghin	(1 462 inhabitants)
 Zipelin	(639 inhabitants)

References

Departments of Burkina Faso
Kourwéogo Province